The Fontainebleau Las Vegas (formerly The Drew Las Vegas) is a hotel and casino currently under construction on the Las Vegas Strip in Winchester, Nevada. It is on the  site previously occupied by the El Rancho Hotel and Casino and the Algiers Hotel. The project was announced as Fontainebleau Las Vegas in May 2005, with initial plans to begin construction by March 2006, and to have the resort opened by 2008. It was intended to be a sister property to the Fontainebleau Miami Beach hotel. It would be developed by Fontainebleau Resorts, which was owned by Jeff Soffer. 

Construction began in February 2007, and the hotel tower was topped off on November 14, 2008. A group of banks had agreed to provide financing, but the group was sued by Fontainebleau in April 2009, after it refused to continue funding the project. Construction was slowed down considerably, and was eventually put on hold in June 2009, when the project went into Chapter 11 bankruptcy. The project was 70-percent completed, and the opening had been scheduled for October 2009. The project, upon completion, was to include a  casino, 2,871 hotel rooms, and 1,018 condo hotel units, among other features. The hotel tower rises 68 stories, standing 737 feet high. It is the tallest building in Las Vegas and in the state, excluding the nearby Strat observation tower. The Fontainebleau was designed by Carlos Zapata Studio with Bergman Walls and Associates as the executive architect.

Carl Icahn purchased the project out of bankruptcy in 2010, but he never restarted construction. In August 2017, the unfinished resort was sold to investment firms Witkoff Group and New Valley LLC for $600 million. In February 2018, Witkoff and Marriott International announced a partnership to open the resort as The Drew Las Vegas. Upon completion, the project would include a casino as well as three hotels with 3,780 rooms; plans for condominiums were scrapped. Witkoff Group founder Steve Witkoff named The Drew after his deceased 22-year-old son, Andrew Witkoff, who died of an OxyContin overdose in 2011. The Drew was intended to open in 2022. However, construction stopped in March 2020, due to the COVID-19 pandemic in Nevada.

In February 2021, Soffer bought back the project through his company Fontainebleau Development, with Koch Real Estate Investments as a partner. Soffer named it back to Fontainebleau Las Vegas and intends to open it in late 2023.

History

Background

The property was initially occupied by the Thunderbird hotel and casino, opened in 1948. It was later renamed as the Silverbird, and then as the El Rancho, before closing in 1992. Turnberry Associates purchased the  property in 2000, for $45 million. The company imploded the El Rancho later that year, to make room for a London-themed resort. The project was ultimately cancelled because of an economic downturn caused by the September 11 attacks.

A privately held company known as Fontainebleau Resorts was later co-founded by Jeff Soffer, who was the chairman and majority owner of Turnberry Associates. In March 2005, Turnberry Associates paid $97 million to purchase  of adjacent property – south of the former El Rancho – that had previously been occupied by the Algiers Hotel. The Algiers was to be replaced by the Krystle Sands, a high-rise condominium project that was cancelled earlier that month.

Fontainebleau Resorts and Turnberry announced the Fontainebleau Las Vegas on May 12, 2005, as a casino and hotel resort. The project would be a sister property to the Fontainebleau Miami Beach hotel, purchased by Fontainebleau Resorts earlier that year. The Fontainebleau would be built on the former property of the El Rancho and Algiers, located immediately west of the Turnberry Place high-rise condominium complex. Groundbreaking was initially expected to occur by March 2006, with the project planned to be opened by 2008. At the time, the company was considering the addition of condominiums to the project, but was still working on the final design plans. Glenn Schaeffer, the former president of Mandalay Resort Group, was hired to oversee the new project as the president and chief executive officer of Fontainebleau Resorts.

The Fontainebleau was designed by Carlos Zapata Studio, with Bergman Walls and Associates serving as the executive architect. The hotel tower would have 3,889 rooms, including 2,871 hotel rooms and 1,018 condo hotel units. In addition, the resort would have more than two dozen restaurants, a performing arts theater, a spa inspired by the Blue Lagoon in Iceland, and a  retail mall known as The Runway. Schaeffer predicted that less than one-third of the resort's revenues would come from its casino.

The Fontainebleau would be LEED-certified, and would have technologically advanced features. The resort would include a large antenna to provide wireless coverage for cell service and Internet access throughout the property. Connectivity issues were common in large resorts because of steel columns and concrete, which interfere with wireless signals. iMac computers would be present in each hotel room, replacing information binders found in most hotels. The computers would be used to request room service and wake-up calls, and to communicate with a concierge or other group members in the hotel. Touch-screen displays would be present throughout the resort, providing information and directions.

Construction

Turnberry West Construction began construction of the Fontainebleau Las Vegas in February 2007. The company did not do any of its own work, instead relying on a network of subcontractors. A 26-acre site north of the project was used as a staging area for construction equipment and workers. The property, owned by Archon Corporation, was leased to the Fontainebleau project for $350,000 a month.

Preparation work on the property was underway in April 2007, although an official groundbreaking ceremony was not held. At that time, the project was expected to cost $2.8 billion. Publishing and Broadcasting Limited purchased 19.6 percent of Fontainebleau Resorts for $250 million to help fund the project. In June 2007, Fontainebleau Resorts secured approximately $4 billion from a group of banks to pay off debts and to finish its projects, including the Fontainebleau Las Vegas, which was expected to open in fall 2009. The company Ullico would also provide financing to the project.

In July 2007, a 70-person team of ironworkers stopped working in areas of the resort that they said were unsafe. They resumed work after three days, following the implementation of several safety measures. The following month, a construction worker died after a 30-foot fall on the property. Several days later, a large concrete slab in the parking garage fell and caused slabs on two lower floors to collapse. No workers were injured or killed by the three large slabs.

The resort's parking garage was to stand seven stories, with the first two floors to be located underground. In mid-2007, plans were approved to increase the garage to 23 stories. Later that year, residents of Turnberry Place alleged that they were deceived by Turnberry, saying they were never notified of the garage's size increase, which would hamper their views. Other residents were concerned about the impact of noise and pollutants from the new project.

Soffer said Turnberry did a "respectful job" of building the Fontainebleau hotel tower away from Turnberry Place residents. Soffer also stated that the property was zoned for a hotel and casino, and said that residents knew such a project would ultimately be built on the property: "We're not going to buy a 20-acre property and leave it as a vacant lot. It's a property with proper zoning and nothing was ever promised. It's as simple as that. […] The bottom line is you can't please everyone." Turnberry Place residents planned to have a district judge rule on whether the Clark County Commission should have approved the garage re-design, which was alleged to be in violation of a county ordinance. The judge ruled in favor of the project, stating that the re-design was legally approved. Aside from the garage, residents had also been concerned about potential traffic increases that would be caused by the new resort.

In April 2008, Fontainebleau Resorts stated that the project was fully financed and that progress was continuing, despite other local projects that had suffered financial problems amid the Great Recession. At the time, the project had $2.4 billion in debt. The company had planned to put the Fontainebleau's condo units on sale in September 2008. Between $700 million and $900 million in presales was expected to come from the units. A total of 6,000 people were expected to be employed at Fontainebleau upon its opening.

The hotel tower rises 68 stories, standing at 737 feet. It is the tallest building in Las Vegas and in the state. The tower was topped off on November 14, 2008. It is a concrete structure that includes 48 elevator shafts.

Financial problems

The collapse of Lehman Brothers in September 2008, during the Great Recession, left a financing shortage in the Fontainebleau's retail component. Two months later, Moody's Investors Service warned that failure to fund the retail loan could result in a default for the Fontainebleau. The agency also downgraded the project's debt funding, noting the decline of gaming revenue and the weak demand for condo hotels in Las Vegas. A preview office for the condo units opened in December 2008, with little fanfare. Sales of the units had yet to begin. In early 2009, Standard & Poor's warned that the Fontainebleau would likely face difficulty in making its interest payments upon its opening in October 2009. Fontainebleau Resorts was believed to have enough financing to complete the project, although the sale of its condo units were pivotal to paying off its debt. Moody's warned that the project would not be able to sell enough units to reduce its construction debt by the time of opening. The agency also warned of the worsening economy, noting a drop in Las Vegas tourism and gaming demand.

In April 2009, the project filed a $3 billion lawsuit against the group of banking lenders, alleging that they reneged on their agreement to provide $800 million in funding. The banks stated that the loan was terminated because of an unspecified default, a claim that the lawsuit denied. A "material adverse change" clause was present in the banks' agreement with Fontainebleau, giving the group wide-ranging options for terminating the loan. The possible stop of construction would affect 3,300 workers who were building the resort. Another 1,700 workers were expected to be hired later on to finish the project. The condo units had yet to go on sale, due to weak demand, and Fontainebleau was reassessing the number of units that the project was to include, given the poor state of the economy.

The resort would have a positive impact on the Las Vegas economy and employment, and the banks' decision to rescind financing was met with criticism. The banks largely declined to comment on the case; they denied wrongdoing but did not specify how the project wound up in default. It was later confirmed that the project had gone substantially over its construction budget, and the banks determined that the project was in default under their credit agreement. The banks also alleged that Fontainebleau officials made inaccurate statements to hide the project's financial problems. According to the banks, Fontainebleau wanted $1.3 billion in debt to be forgiven.

The bank group was led by Bank of America, which began negotiating with Fontainebleau shortly after the lawsuit was filed. Through a separate lending group, the project had $130 million to continue construction while the lawsuit proceeded. However, the second group partially pulled its financing in late April 2009, after the first group rescinded its loan on the project. The latest pulling of funds was substantial enough to affect construction; work was reduced to skeleton crews, and construction proceeded at a slower pace. The worker layoffs had the potential to delay the project, depending on whether the same crews would be retained once full construction resumed. In addition, much of the construction equipment on-site – including two tower cranes – was rented and would have to be returned, only to be reassembled again later on. In May 2009, Fontainebleau filed an amendment to its lawsuit, stating that Deutsche Bank, part of the main banking group, had a conflict of interest. The bank had an ownership stake in the upcoming Cosmopolitan resort, also under construction on the Las Vegas Strip. Deutsche Bank was accused of "seeking to destroy the Fontainebleau in order to minimize competition" for the Cosmopolitan. The bank was to provide $80 million to the Fontainebleau. The allegations against Deutsche Bank were eventually dropped.

During May 2009, construction consulting firm CCCS International filed a lawsuit against the Fontainebleau, alleging wrongful termination from the project. CCCS was hired as construction manager in 2008. According to the company, Fontainebleau officials said that the project was "severely over budget" and needed a construction manager to provide cost management and auditing services, in order to recover "prior unnecessary overpayments." During its time on the project, CCCS concluded that Fontainebleau was inadequate in its designing, supervising, and scheduling of the project, leading to significant construction delays. In its lawsuit, CCCS alleged the discovery of "fraudulent billing practices and inappropriate payment methods" used by the Fontainebleau, stating that this discovery led to its termination. CCCS also alleged that Fontainebleau did not have financing to fund its consulting services, and that the project failed to disclose this. CCCS stated that it was owed more than $1 million. A Fontainebleau spokesman said that CCCS was fired because it failed to perform its duties. The Fontainebleau had gone an estimated $375 million over its most recent revised budget, and financial analysts expected the resort to cost at least $3.5 billion upon completion, up substantially from its original cost.

Corporate layoffs began in May 2009, a result of the bank group withholding its loan. Schaeffer was among those who left the project, without explanation. Schaeffer had been primarily responsible for securing more than $1 billion in loans for the Fontainebleau, and he was to operate the resort's casino. His departure was considered a poor sign for the project's future, with the October 2009 opening unlikely to happen. The project had approximately 250 construction workers remaining.

Bankruptcy
Facing numerous liens and financing problems, the Fontainebleau filed for Chapter 11 bankruptcy on June 9, 2009. The project had 1,000 to 5,000 creditors, including various subcontractors who were owed more than $250 million. Subcontractors wanted a committee formed to represent them in the bankruptcy proceedings, rather than Turnberry West Construction. The $3 billion lawsuit against the bank group was withdrawn and instead refiled in U.S. bankruptcy court. Fontainebleau Las Vegas LLC sought court approval for an immediate $656 million loan from the bank group. However, the banks did not believe that this would be nearly enough to finish construction. Meanwhile, Crown Limited (previously Publishing and Broadcasting Limited) ended any further investment in the Fontainebleau project. On June 11, 2009, it was announced that construction had been halted while the project proceeded through bankruptcy. The resort was 70 percent completed, and the site was secured to prevent theft of construction equipment and vandalism of lower floors, which were fully furnished.

Construction on Fontainebleau had begun before the final designs were finished, a common practice that was done for Las Vegas resorts to get them opened sooner. However, this would often result in costly do-over work having to be done. When construction on Fontainebleau was halted, there were still areas of the project that had yet to be finalized. Other areas of the resort, such as the casino and hotel rooms, had undergone numerous redesigns. Restaurants were among the uncompleted portions of the resort, although many hotel rooms had been finished. The project owed more than $2 billion to various creditors. Because of the worsening economy, it was unlikely that the Fontainebleau could pay off such debts even if it opened within the next year. In July 2009, Fontainebleau and its affiliated companies stated that design changes were being considered to contain the project's high construction cost. In addition, Soffer considered providing additional financing himself to get the resort finished. The resort subsequently sought permission in bankruptcy court to cancel events that were scheduled for the first half of 2010, as well as permission to cancel a lease for office space which was to be used for Fontainebleau's employee recruitment center.

A month after the bankruptcy filing, the case was complicated further by term lenders who sued the bank group. In addition, Turnberry West filed a lawsuit against its sister company, Fontainebleau Las Vegas LLC, which owned the project. Turnberry West alleged that its liens against the project took priority over those filed by lenders. Both companies were owned by Soffer. This move, in which Soffer essentially sued himself, was viewed as an attempt to force creditors to supply funding. Mediation attempts, between Fontainebleau and the banks, were unsuccessful, and a judge determined that the case would go to trial. Financial lawsuits involving the Fontainebleau would go on for years. In one case, a group of term lenders sued Soffer, Crown Limited, and Ullico, alleging that they presented false architectural drawings to conceal the project's true construction cost, and that they later conspired to hide the Fontainebleau's financial problems. In Fontainebleau's lawsuit, a judge would eventually rule in Bank of America's favor; the bank later reached a $300 million settlement with lenders.

Prospective buyers and Icahn purchase

In June 2009, executives from Apollo Management and Wynn Resorts toured the Fontainebleau facility with an interest in purchasing the project. Ullico was also in discussions with Fontainebleau to help finance the resort's completion, after already contributing $447.6 million to the project. In September 2009, Penn National Gaming emerged as a prospective buyer. Penn had toured the project several times, and it sought a partner to help finish the resort. Penn planned to convert the condo units into hotel rooms, and there was also the possibility of renaming the project. The company expected to have the resort opened in late 2011.

In October 2009, a judge overseeing the bankruptcy case ruled that the Fontainebleau project be sold as soon as possible, appointing an examiner to handle the sale. However, the term lenders had wanted the Chapter 11 case converted into a Chapter 7 liquidation. Penn offered $50 million for the project. In November 2009, corporate raider and financier Carl Icahn – who previously controlled American Casino & Entertainment Properties – offered $156 million. A bidding war ensued, and Penn dropped out of the auction in January 2010, after Icahn raised his bid to $156 million. Meanwhile, real estate developer Luke Brugnara announced that he would place a $170 million bid for the Fontainebleau. Brugnara planned to finish and open the retail portion, using the eventual revenue to complete the hotel tower.

Icahn ultimately won control of the Fontainebleau with a $106 million bid, taking over ownership on February 18, 2010. He also paid $45 million in financing fees during bankruptcy proceedings. Icahn was the only qualified person to bid on the project; two other bids were disqualified because they failed to include a deposit. Before deciding on what to do with the Fontainebleau project, Icahn planned to wait for a rebound of the Las Vegas economy. The project would require up to $1.5 billion to complete construction, and some analysts believed that demolishing the resort would be more cost-effective than trying to complete it. While the project sat vacant, it was sometimes used by local firefighters as a training ground for fire drills.

In October 2010, Icahn auctioned off the furnishings previously intended for the resort, an indication that he had no intention of finishing the project. As part of a renovation, the Plaza Hotel & Casino in downtown Las Vegas purchased various furnishings, wallpaper, and tiles that were meant for the Fontainebleau. The Buffalo Bill's hotel-casino in Primm, Nevada also purchased $500,000 worth of furnishings for a renovation of its own.

A large crane, used for constructing the hotel tower, was eventually dismantled in May 2014. The crane, like the unfinished resort, was considered an eyesore and a reminder of the Great Recession. Rusted, lower-floor portions of the unfinished resort were located along the sidewalk on Las Vegas Boulevard, presenting a poor appearance for the area. In 2015, Icahn agreed to county requests for an exterior upgrade, which would help improve the project's appearance. A cosmetic wrap, consisting of fabric and paint, would cover the unfinished portions, similar to the stalled St. Regis tower, also on the Las Vegas Strip. The blue-and-white wrap was eventually added in 2017.

In November 2015, Icahn listed the Fontainebleau for sale at an asking price of $650 million. The project was listed through the CBRE Group. The Fontainebleau required another $1.5 billion to finish, and the tower would take up to two years to complete. According to CBRE Group, "Combined with a purchase price of $650 million, it would take less than $2 billion for a buyer to enter or expand on the Strip market. That's about $500,000 per room, just half of the $1 million or more per room to build new." Various rumors persisted over the next few years about a possible sale. Richard Bosworth and Juniper Capital Partners wanted to purchase the Fontainebleau, and in early 2017, they approached Brookfield Asset Management as a possible equity partner. Bosworth planned to sell portions of the Fontainebleau to a timeshare operator, while the top floors were to be branded as a Waldorf Astoria hotel. These plans did not work out, and Bosworth and Juniper Capital ultimately bought the nearby Hard Rock Hotel instead.

The Drew Las Vegas
In August 2017, investment firms Witkoff Group and New Valley LLC purchased the resort for $600 million, with plans to rename it. Additional plans were not disclosed for the project at that time. The purchase and planned improvements were financed through Deutsche Bank, Goldman Sachs and JPMorgan. In subsequent months, the Las Vegas-based Grand Canyon Development Partners became involved with the project, which also had new hotel operators. The company planned to water-proof the building immediately and eventually complete it, with a substantial interior and exterior redesign. The Fontainebleau was referred to as Project Blue in county records at the time. Penta Building Group was hired to finish the resort, with construction expected to resume in 2018. Plans to finish the project's design and to obtain a construction loan were expedited in December 2017, after the passage of the Tax Cuts and Jobs Act of 2017. The project would create 5,000 construction jobs, and 6,000 jobs upon opening.

On February 12, 2018, Witkoff and Marriott International announced a partnership to open the renamed project as The Drew Las Vegas in late 2020. In addition to the Drew hotel, the resort would also house hotels from two Marriott brands, EDITION and JW Marriott Hotels, making it the first JW Marriott hotel to open on the Las Vegas Strip. Marriott would manage the three hotels, and would also invest $50 million in the project. The resort would feature a casino and 3,780 hotel rooms; condominiums were no longer planned for the tower.

The project's new name received puzzled reactions because of its unclear meaning. A representative for Steve Witkoff's company stated that The Drew "feels familiar and approachable, but also fresh and modern – it reflects what people are craving in Las Vegas and signals the experiences Witkoff and Marriott will deliver." The new name is also a tribute to Witkoff's deceased 22-year-old son, Andrew Witkoff, who died of an OxyContin overdose in 2011. Before his purchase, Steve Witkoff said he had heard "nasty rumors" about the building being in poor condition. He said that such rumors turned out to be false and that the building was in exceptional condition. Witkoff had plans for a bridge to connect The Drew to the expanded Las Vegas Convention Center, which was scheduled to complete its expansion in 2020. A man trespassed onto the Drew property in March 2018, and sparked a number of fires out of boredom. The fires caused $10 million in damage to several areas, including a ballroom and the 11th floor of the parking garage. The man was later apprehended and charged with arson.

In April 2019, Witkoff announced that the opening would be delayed until the second quarter of 2022. The delay was attributed to the amount of time spent working on the project's design. The total cost would be $3.1 billion, including the $600 million purchase price, approximately $1.2 billion in construction, and hundreds of millions of dollars for pre-opening costs. The building interior was cavernous and included unfinished escalators, walls, and ceilings, as well as exposed beams and columns. The interior also contained a partially built theater. Witkoff stated the delay would give him better certainty regarding the construction budget. He also announced that a substantial amount of the eventual resort's profits would go to a family foundation that fights drug addiction, in honor of his son. The resort was designed by the architecture firm Diller Scofidio + Renfro. Bobby Baldwin was announced as the chief executive officer of The Drew Las Vegas in November 2019.

Witkoff expected to finalize a construction loan of approximately $2 billion during early 2020. At the time, Witkoff said the interior of the building was active with hundreds of workers, and that a much larger construction presence would be noticeable later in the year with potentially 2,000 workers. The resort was expected to be opened by November 2022. However, construction was suspended in March 2020, due to the COVID-19 pandemic in Nevada. Several months later, contractors filed liens totaling millions of dollars, for allegedly unpaid work. In addition, executives who had recently joined the project were laid off amid the pandemic, and they sued for lack of salary, alleging that their employee contract was broken.

Return to Fontainebleau

In February 2021, sixteen years after he first announced it, Jeffrey Soffer bought back the project through his Florida-based company, Fontainebleau Development. The company partnered with Koch Real Estate Investments on the purchase, and various options were under consideration for the property, which was 75-percent complete. Soffer had given little thought to returning to the project, until the pandemic resulted in the opportunity to buy it back. The project was purchased for $350 million, and the property was valued at $615.5 million. Marriott exited the project later in 2021, citing an amicable agreement with Fontainebleau Development, which instead would manage and operate the hotel itself.

On November 9, 2021, Fontainebleau Development held a construction commencement ceremony for the project, announcing that it would be renamed Fontainebleau Las Vegas once again, with the opening scheduled for late 2023. Richardson Construction was hired as general contractor. Soffer intends to stick largely to the project's original 2006 plans, though with some modern updates. The Fontainebleau's retail mall will be greatly reduced from the initial plans, and condominiums will not be part of the project.

Features
Fontainebleau's proposed features include a  casino, and 3,780 hotel rooms. The  retail area will cover two floors and include approximately 35 high-end retailers. The resort will have a focus on conferences, taking advantage of its location near the Las Vegas Convention Center. The property is also expected to feature entertainment options, including a performing theater, a nightclub, and a dayclub on the ninth-floor pool deck.

In media
The Fontainebleau is depicted in the 2014-15 television series Dominion, in which it has become a hydroponic farm known as the Agri-Tower.

See also

 List of tallest buildings in the United States
 Landmark (hotel and casino), once the tallest building in Nevada; opened in 1969 after several years of delays

References

External links

 
 Fontainebleau renderings

Casinos in the Las Vegas Valley
Companies that filed for Chapter 11 bankruptcy in 2009
Las Vegas Strip
Resorts in the Las Vegas Valley
Skyscraper hotels in Winchester, Nevada
Unfinished buildings and structures in the United States
Diller Scofidio + Renfro buildings